Freundlich is a lunar impact crater that is located on the far side of the Moon. It lies midway between the craters Trumpler to the north-northwest and the irregular Buys-Ballot to the south-southeast. This crater has a circular rim that is more heavily eroded at the northern and southern ends. Groups of craters lie across the floor to the southeast and the north, and individual small craters lie elsewhere within the interior. The crater is named after Erwin Freundlich.

The crater lies within the Freundlich-Sharonov Basin.

Satellite craters
By convention these features are identified on lunar maps by placing the letter on the side of the crater midpoint that is closest to Freundlich.

References

External links

 Lunar Orbiter Image

Impact craters on the Moon